Saußbach (also: Saußwasser and Teufelsbach) is a river of Bavaria, Germany. The uppermost 4.8 km of its course forms part of the border with the Czech Republic. At its confluence with the Reschbach west of Freyung, the Wolfsteiner Ohe is formed.

See also
List of rivers of Bavaria

References

Rivers of Bavaria
Rivers of Germany